Krishna's grand daughter in law Uṣā is known as Okha in Gujarati language.

Okha may also refer to:
Okha, India, a town in India
Okha Port
Okha railway station
Okha, Russia, a town in Russia
Okha Airport

See also
Oka (disambiguation)
Yokosuka MXY-7 Ohka, a Japanese attack plane